Stephen H. Schanuel (14 July 1933 – 21 July 2014) was an American mathematician working in the fields of abstract algebra and category theory, number theory, and measure theory.

Life
While he was a graduate student at University of Chicago, he discovered Schanuel's lemma, an essential lemma in homological algebra. Schanuel received his Ph.D. in mathematics from Columbia University in 1963, under the supervision of Serge Lang.

Work
Shortly thereafter he stated a conjecture in the field of transcendental number theory, which remains an important open problem to this day. Schanuel was a professor emeritus of mathematics at University at Buffalo.

Books

References

External links
 
 

1933 births
2014 deaths
20th-century American mathematicians
21st-century American mathematicians
Columbia University alumni
University at Buffalo faculty
People from St. Louis
Mathematicians from Missouri
Algebraists